Popular Committees may refer to any of the following organizations:
Popular Committees (Syria)
Popular Committees (Yemen)
Palestinian Popular Committees
Popular Resistance Committees
Popular Resistance Committees (Yemen)

See also
Revolutionary committee (disambiguation)